Ariyapadaiveedu is a village in the Kumbakonam taluk of Thanjavur district, Tamil Nadu.

Demographics 

As per the 2001 census, Aiyapadaiveedu had a total population of 922, with 481 males, and 441 females. The sex ratio was 917. The literacy rate was 78.9.

References 

 

Villages in Thanjavur district